The 2021 Canada Sevens was held as two rugby sevens tournaments on consecutive weekends in late September that year. The first was hosted at BC Place in Vancouver and the second  at Commonwealth Stadium in Edmonton. These events were played as the sixth season of the Canada Sevens. They were the only stops on the 2021 World Rugby Sevens Series, following the cancellation of all other planned tournaments due to impacts of the COVID-19 pandemic.

Format
The twelve teams at each tournament were drawn into three pools of four teams. A round-robin was held for each pool, where each team played the others in their pool once. The top two teams from each pool, plus the two best third-placed on comparative pool standings, advanced to the Cup quarterfinals to compete for tournament honours. The other teams from each pool went to the challenge playoffs for ninth to twelfth place.

Teams
The national men's teams competing at the Vancouver and Edmonton tournaments were:

Vancouver
The first tournament of the 2021 Canada Sevens  was hosted at BC Place in Vancouver on 18–19 September 2021. South Africa won the tournament, defeating Kenya by 38–5 in the final, to take the maximum 20 points in the series standings leading into the second tournament in Edmonton.

All times in Pacific Daylight Time (UTC−07:00). The pools were scheduled as follows:

Key:  Team advanced to the quarterfinals

Pool A

Pool B

Pool C

9th to 12th playoffs

5th to 8th playoffs

Cup playoffs

Tournament placings

Source: World Rugby

Edmonton
The second tournament of the 2021 Canada Sevens was hosted at Commonwealth Stadium in Edmonton on 25–26 September. South Africa won the tournament, defeating Great Britain by 24–12 in the final, to take the maximum 40 points in the series standings and win their 4th World Rugby Sevens Series title.

All times in Mountain Daylight Time (UTC−06:00). The pools were scheduled as follows:

Key:  Team advanced to the quarterfinals

Pool A

Pool B

Pool C

9th to 12th playoffs

5th to 8th playoffs

Cup playoffs

Tournament placings

Source: World Rugby

See also
 2021 Canada Women's Sevens (Fast Four)

References

External links
Tournament page
World Rugby page for the Vancouver tournament
World Rugby page for the Edmonton tournament

2021
Canada Sevens 2021
Canada Sevens 2021
Canada Sevens
Canada Sevens
Canada Sevens
Canada Sevens
Canada Sevens